Araksya Karapetyan (born August 27, 1982) is an Armenian-born American television personality and anchor woman for the Los Angeles-based  KTTV FOX11's Good Day L.A.

Early life
Karapetyan was born on August 27, 1982 in Armenia's second largest city of Gyumri (then called Leninakan). She witnessed the 1988 Armenian earthquake that left her native city devastated. In an article written following a March 17, 2014 earthquake in Los Angeles, Karapetyan wrote: "Every time we get a shaker here in Southern California I quickly have a flashback to my childhood. I was 6-years old in 1988 when a devastating earthquake hit my hometown in Gyumri." Meanwhile, the ethnic conflict with Azerbaijan intensified as the Soviet Union was on its way to collapse. Due to these hardships her family emigrated to the United States in 1990. She grew up in Palos Verdes Estates, California.

Education and career
She graduated from Syracuse University's S. I. Newhouse School of Public Communications with a degree in international relations and broadcast journalism. Karapetyan began her television career as an intern at KABC-TV in Los Angeles and KFI 640 AM radio in Burbank, California. In the past, she has also worked for KIDK-TV in Idaho Falls, Idaho (as reporter, anchor and producer), KOIN-TV in Portland, Oregon (as a reporter and host) and as a reporter at CitiCABLE, a government access cable television channel for the City of Torrance, California.

Personal life
Karapetyan is fluent in English, Armenian and is "conversational" in Russian and Spanish. She is married to Amir Yousefi and they have two daughters.

References

External links
Araksya Karapetyan  on KTTV

Araksya Karapetyan on Twitter
Araksya Karapetyan on Instagram

1982 births
Living people
People from Gyumri
American people of Armenian descent
American television reporters and correspondents
Television anchors from Los Angeles
Syracuse University alumni